Bhuwan K.C. (born: 17 September 1956) is a Nepali actor, director, producer, singer, and politician known for his work in Nepali cinema. He has started career through Radio Nepal as a childhood artist. He was among the most commercially successful Nepali actors of the 1980s, 1990s and 2000s. He is also the current chairman of Film Development Board, he was appointed for this position on 26 July 2022.

Film Career 
K.C. started his career at the age of 10 as a singer for Radio Nepal with songs such as Jage Jage Sara Raat, Aru Kalo Rail Ko Dhuwale, and Mayalu Timi Tadha. His debut movie was Juni (1981) but it was the 1982 release Samjhana (1983) that helped establish him as a successful actor. Since then, K.C. has gone on to act in numerous successful films like Kusume Rumal (1985), Santaan (1987), Tilhari (1988), Kanyadan (1990), Chino (1990), Trishna (1991), Dui Thopa Aansu (1993), Dakshina (1994), Raanko (1995) Karodpati (1997), Nepali Babu (1999), and Superstar (2003). He directed Dreams (2016), starring his son Anmol K.C. in the lead role.

Political life 
KC is a member of the largest democratic party of Nepal, the Nepali Congress, which he joined after leaving CPN (UML) on the early eve of accusing the party leadership of the former party. Earlier in 2022, he planned to run for the mayor position in the 2022 Kathmandu municipal election, at the time he was associated with Advanced Democratic Party; however, due to some unknown reason he stepped back and decided not to run for the position; he left the party and joined Nepali Congress.

Controversies 
In June 2020, actor Samragyee RL Shah uploaded a video to Instagram detailing harassment of a sexual and emotional nature from a senior film industry veteran. Numerous news outlets later identified the man as Bhuwan K.C. K.C then filed a defamation case against Shah, even though she had not mentioned him by name. Film director Naresh Poudel filed a writ petition against him on August 11, 2022, before the Supreme Court of Nepal.

Filmography

Singing career

Albums 
 Aina
 Kantipur
 Muskan
 Nausay Khola
 Pokhara
 Sabailai
 Sadhana
 Smarika

Awards and nominations

References

External links

Living people
1957 births
Actors from Kathmandu
Nepalese male models
Nepalese film producers
20th-century Nepalese male actors
20th-century Nepalese male singers
Khas people
Nepalese male film actors
Nepali Congress politicians from Bagmati Province
Nepalese actor-politicians